The Caspian Depression (Kaspıı mańy oıpaty; , Caspian Lowland) or Pricaspian/Peri-Caspian Depression/Lowland is a low-lying flatland region encompassing the northern part of the Caspian Sea, the largest enclosed body of water  on Earth. It is the larger northern part of the wider Aral-Caspian Depression around the Aral and Caspian Seas.



Geography
The depression lies at the southern end of the Ryn Desert, and is in both Kazakhstan and Russia. Most of the Russian Republic of Kalmykia lies in the Caspian Depression. The Volga River and the Ural River flow into the Caspian Sea through this region.  The deltas of the Ural and Volga Rivers are  extensive wetlands. The North Caspian depression is part of the continental or semi-arid desert biome. The area receives  of rain per year, on average, and less than 10% of the region is irrigated. The main rivers of the lowland beside the Volga and the Ural are the Emba, Terek and Kuma. There are also numerous salt lakes, such as Baskunchak, Inder, Aralsor, Kamys-Samara, Elton and Botkul.

The Caspian Depression is below sea level, consisting of large areas of  marshlands in the eastern region. The area is very rich in underground oil and gas reserves, and oil and natural gas pipelines cross the depression from north to south and east to west. Many geologists believe the Caspian Sea and the depression were formed by tectonic forces. Some of them also believe that the North Caspian depression became separated from the open ocean in ancient times to form an enormous salt lake. Part of the ancient Silk Road ran through this region. The two largest cities in the depression are Astrakhan in Russia and Atyrau in Kazakhstan. Today, the region is used mainly for livestock raising.

The depression is also noted for salt domes, particularly Volgograd salt. It increases dramatically as one travels from the Ryn Desert toward the Caspian Sea. Russian satellite photos have revealed huge deposits of salt domes (about 1,200), in the Caspian Depression in western Kazakhstan.

The southern region of the depression, or the north coast of the Caspian Sea, is characterized by the large development of damp sites resulting from tidal phenomena. The depression is also home to many insect species, with several thousand different species likely living in the region around the Caspian Sea. Studies have shown that water pollution, mostly coming from the Volga River, poses a serious threat to the biodiversity of the Caspian Depression. Water pollution is contributed mainly by industrial, agricultural, and household discharges.

See also
 Caspian lowland desert

References

 Evaporites of North Border of North Caspian Depression – Internet Geology News Letter No. 178, January 13, 2003.
  Space Today Online.

 
Lowest points
East European Plain
Depressions of Europe